Henry William Harrington (September 12, 1825 – March 20, 1882) was an American lawyer and politician who served one term as a U.S. Representative from Indiana from 1863 to 1865.

Biography 
Born near Cooperstown, New York, Harrington attended the common schools and in 1845 entered Temple Hill Academy, Livingston County, New York, where he remained for three years.
He studied law in Geneseo.
He was admitted to the bar in 1848 and commenced practice in Nunda, New York.

He moved to Madison, Indiana, in 1856 and continued the practice of law.
He moved to St. Louis, Missouri, in 1872.
He returned to Indiana in 1874, settled in Indianapolis, and resumed the practice of law.

Political career 
He served as delegate to the Democratic National Conventions in 1860, 1868, and 1872.

Harrington was elected as a Democrat to the Thirty-eighth Congress (March 4, 1863 – March 3, 1865).
He was an unsuccessful candidate for reelection in 1864 to the Thirty-ninth Congress.

He served as collector of internal revenue for the third district of Indiana from October 27, 1866, to March 3, 1867.

Later career and death 
He again engaged in the practice of law.

He died in Indianapolis, Indiana, March 20, 1882.
He was interred in Evergreen Cemetery, Alpena, Michigan.

References

1825 births
1882 deaths
People from Madison, Indiana
Democratic Party members of the United States House of Representatives from Indiana
People from Otsego County, New York
People from Livingston County, New York
19th-century American politicians